Academia Nacional de Bellas Artes San Alejandro, is the oldest and most prestigious fine arts school in Cuba. It is also known as Escuela Nacional de Bellas Artes "San Alejandro", Academia San Alejandro, or San Alejandro Academy. The school is located in Marianao, a suburb of Havana, and was founded in 1818 at the Convent of San Alejandro.

It is located today in a monumental building built in the early 1940s.

Beginning
The school was founded with the support of the Economic Society of Friends of the Country and the General Intendant of the Treasury and was founded under the direction of the French artist Jean Baptiste Vermay (1784–1833). The school was named after Don Alejandro Ramírez, general superintendent and director of the Royal Economic Society of Friends of the Country.

It is the educational center with the largest number of years building the teaching on the lands of Latin America, preceded only by the University of Havana. It turned-from a number of changes that occurred in Spain in the 19th century and not surprisingly was felt in the colonies, in the climate of the Constitution of Cádiz of 1812 and enlightened absolutism. It was established by the Royal Patriotic Society and the Royal Consulate of Havana, as the Free School of Drawing and Painting. Its first director, Juan Bautista Vermay, who arrived in Cuba when the Bonaparte empire collapsed, when he was 31 years old.

Administration
The internal life at San Alejandro is governed by the Board of Directors who in turn appoints the Technical Council, who in turn run the different departments that make up the teaching faculty.

The Board of Directors consists of the Director and Deputy Director and the Secretaries  Speciality Teaching, Education, Health Care-Economic, Business and Education.

The Technical Board, in turn, is the body responsible for representing the teaching faculty to the Board of Directors. It consists of all deans of each departments. These are the Deans of Drawing, Painting, Engraving, Sculpture, Ceramics, Jewelry, Graphic Arts and Theoretical-Cultural Teachings.

San Alejandro has exchanges with many schools abroad, including in the UK The Cardinal Wiseman Catholic School. Over the past three years, three exchanges have taken place. The exchanges consisted of the students from Wiseman travelling to Cuba in February, and the Cuban students coming to London in June.

Directors

Notable alumni

Antonia Eiriz
Nela Arias-Misson
Manuel Carbonell
Pablo Borges Delgado
Agustín Fernández
Antonio Gattorno
Juan Esnard Heydrich
Alicia Leal
Víctor Manuel
Amelia Peláez
Roberto Juan Diago Querol
Manuel Rodulfo Tardo
Fernando Velázquez Vigil
Manuel Mendive
Belkis Ayón
Sandra Ramos
Tania Bruguera
José Toirac
Jose Bedia
Fayad Jamís
Osvaldo Salas
Eberto Escobedo Lazo
 Juan Roberto Diago Durruthy
 José Martí
 Wifredo Lam
 Flora Fong
 Rita Longa

References

External links

 Escuela Nacional de Bellas Artes “San Alejandro” website

Buildings and structures in Havana
Education in Havana
Culture in Havana
Educational institutions established in 1818
Academia Nacional de Bellas Artes San Alejandro